Keshav Sitaram Thackeray (17 September 1885 – 20 November 1973; born Keshav Sitaram Panvelkar, also known as Keshav Sitaram Dhodapkar, but commonly known by his pen name Prabodhankar Thackeray), was an Indian social reformer. He campaigned against superstitions, untouchability, child marriage and dowry. He was also a prolific author.

He was one of the key leaders of the Samyukta Maharashtra Samiti which successfully campaigned for the linguistic state of Maharashtra. He was the father of Bal Thackeray, who founded the Shiv Sena, a pro-Marathi Hindu nationalist party leader. He is also the grandfather of former Shiv Sena chief and Chief minister of Maharashtra Uddhav Thackeray and Maharashtra Navnirman Sena chief Raj Thackeray. There is a school in Pune named after him.

Early life 

Keshav Thackeray (born Keshav Panvelkar) was born on 17 September 1885 in Panvel in a Chandraseniya Kayastha Prabhu (CKP) family. According to his autobiography Mazhi Jeevangatha, one of his ancestors was a Killedar of the Dhodap fort during the Maratha rule. His great-grandfather Krushnaji Madhav Dhodapkar ("Appasaheb") resided in Pali, Raigad, while his grandfather Ramchandra "Bhikoba" Dhodapkar settled in Panvel. Keshav's father Sitaram was born Sitaram Ramchandra Dhodapkar but he adopted the surname "Panvelkar" after growing up, as per the tradition, but while admitting his son in the school, he gave him the surname "Thakre", which was apparently their original traditional family name before "Dhodapkar". An admirer of the India-born British writer William Makepeace Thackeray, Keshav later anglicized the spelling of his surname to "Thackeray".

When Keshav was still a teenager, his father died in a plague epidemic, in 1902. Keshav was educated at Panvel, Kalyan, Baramati and Bombay (now Mumbai). Outside the Bombay Presidency, he studied at the Victoria High School in Dewas (Central Provinces), and later, at the Calcutta University. He finally settled in Bombay.

Social and Political activism 

Keshav Thackeray's own Chandraseniya Kayastha Prabhu (CKP) caste ranked just next to the Brahmins in the caste hierarchy, but he refused to accept this old social hierarchy.  He is often described as a social activist or social reformer for his rejection of caste system.

When the prominent Marathi historian VK Rajwade the upper-caste Kshatriya status claimed by the CKPs in a 1916 essay, Thackeray became one of his fiercest critics, and denounced his research as casteist. He wrote a text outlining the identity of the CKP caste, and its contributions to the Maratha empire. In this text, Gramanyachya Sadhyant Itihas, Thackeray talked about the discrimination suffered by other communities at the hands of the Brahmins during the Maratha rule. He was not much concerned about the ritual caste status, but sought to prove that many non-Brahmin communities (specifically the CKPs) had played a major role in the history of the Maratha empire. He wrote that the CKPs "provided the cement" for Shivaji's swaraj (self-rule) "with their blood", and supported him even before the Kshatriyas of Rajput origin joined him. Thackeray also replied to him in the Marathi book Kodandache Tanatkar (1918). Thackeray was supported in his defence by another writer Keshav Trimbak Gupte who replied to Rajwade in his sanskrit and Marathi book Rajwadyanchi Gagabhatti(1919) in which he produced verbatim the letters written by the Shankaracharya in 1830 formally endorsing the CKPs Kshatriya status by referring to them as Chandraseniya Kshatriyas and letters from Banares Brahmins (1779, 1801) and Pune Brahmins ratified by Bajirao II himself in 1796 that gave them privilege over the Vedas.

Prabodhankar with his followers would ridicule the social evil of dowry by having a fake marriage procession, wearing entirely black, and following a donkey with a wedding head-band carrying the message, A person taking dowry is going for a marriage. Some Brahmins sued him for his anti-dowry demonstrations but the British Judge supported him by asking: 'Why is the police harassing Prabodhankar when he is fighting for a good cause?'

Keshav Thackeray played an important role in the Samyukta Maharashtra movement aimed at establishing the linguistic state of Maharashtra. He joined the movement in 1951, demanding the inclusion of the Dang district in Maharashtra instead of neighbouring Gujarat state. He was one of the founding members of the Samyukta Maharashtra Samiti, which campaigned for the formation of Maharashtra and the inclusion of Belgaum and Mumbai in it.

Literary career 

Keshav Thackeray wrote in the Marathi language. He started a fortnightly magazine named Prabodhan ("Enlighten"), which is the origin of his pen name Prabodhankar. His other Marathi language works include the following:

 Autobiography
 Mazhi Jeevangatha ("My autobiography")

 Historical research
 Pratapsingh Chhatrapati and Rango Bapuji
 Gramanyachya Sadhyant Itihas Arthat Nokarashiche Banda (A Comprehensive History of Rebellion or the Revolt of the Bureaucrats), published by Yashwant Shivram Raje in 1919, at Mumbai
 Bhikshushahiche Band
 Kodandacha Tanatkar

 Opinion
 Dagalbaaj Shivaji
 Devalacha dharma aani dharmaachi devale

 Translation
 
 Shanimahatmya
 Shetkaryanche Swarajya (The self-rule of the farmers)

 Plays
 Khara Brahman
 Sangeet Vidhinishedh
 Taklele Por
 Sangeet Seetashuddhi

 Biographies
 Shri Sant Gadgebaba
 Pandit Ramabai Saraswati

 Collected Articles
 Uth Marathya Uth (Arise Marathi People Arise; This is a collection of his 12 articles which appeared in the weekly 'Marmik', following the establishment of Shiv Sena, first published in 1973, it will be published again in 2013 by 'Navta Book World')

Personal life 

Keshav Thackeray's wife was Ramabai Thackeray, who died around 1943. He had 8 children: Bal Thackeray, Shrikant Thackeray (father of Raj Thackeray), Ramesh Thackeray, Prabhavati (Pama) Tipnis, Sarla Gadkari, Susheela Gupte, Sanjeevani Karandikar, and Sudha Sule. Prabodhankar Thackeray also had two brothers named Vinayakrao Thackeray and Yeshwant Thackeray.

Accolades
Maharashtra Chief Minister Devendra Fadnavis unveiled a portrait of Prabodhankar inside the hall at BMC, which he said was long overdue. 
Fadnavis said "Prabodhankar Ji fought against all the odds when the society was in the grip of illiteracy, untouchability, superstitions, and created an atmosphere of public opinion against these social evils". His grandson Uddhav Thackeray also outlined the  social reformist contributions by his grandfather in the abolishing of child marriage, untouchability and enabling women empowerment.

References

External links 

  

Bal Thackeray
Marathi-language writers
Writers from Mumbai
People from Raigad district
University of Calcutta alumni
1885 births
1973 deaths
Politicians from Mumbai
20th-century Indian politicians
20th-century Indian biographers
20th-century Indian dramatists and playwrights
Indian Hindus
20th-century Indian essayists
20th-century Indian translators
Thackeray family
Writers about activism and social change
19th-century Indian male writers